Totò, Peppino e...la dolce vita (a.k.a. Toto, Peppino and the Sweet Life) is a 1961 Italian comedy film directed by Sergio Corbucci.

It is a parody of Federico Fellini's La Dolce Vita, and it was filmed on the same sets.

Plot 
Antonio Barbacane is sent by his wealthy grandfather to Rome to influence corrupt politicians to shift the route of a motorway into their small provincial town, and thus increase the land's value. Instead of accomplishing his mission, he indulges in the pleasures of the city. His cousin Peppino, the town's municipal secretary, a moralist and an upright man to the point of  ordering the removal of La dolce vita's film posters, is sent there to check on Antonio.

Cast 
Totò: Antonio Barbacane/Grandfather Barbacane
Peppino De Filippo: Peppino Barbacane
Mara Berni: Elena, Guglielmo's wife and Oscar's lover
Francesco Mulè: Guglielmo, a.k.a. Gugo
Rosalba Neri: Magda, a libertine girl
Antonio Pierfederici: Count Oscar
Gloria Paul: Patricia 
Peppino De Martino: Minister in Italian government
Taina Berjll: Alice
Daniele Vargas:  Daniele Fortebraccio De Pitonis (as Daniele Varcas)
Mario Castellani:  S.p.a. president
Sergio Corbucci : Man by public telephone with flipping coin

References

External links

1961 films
Films directed by Sergio Corbucci
Italian parody films
Films set in Rome
Italian buddy comedy films
1960s buddy comedy films
1960s parody films
Films with screenplays by Giovanni Grimaldi
1961 comedy films
1960s Italian-language films
1960s Italian films